William Kirk (17 April 1909 - 1997) was an English professional rugby league footballer who played in the 1920s and 1930s.

Playing career

International honours
Billy Kirk won a cap for England while at Warrington in 1930 against Other Nationalities.

Challenge Cup Final appearances
Billy Kirk played , and was carried off injured (before the era before of the interchange/substitute) in Warrington's 3-5 defeat by Swinton in the 1928 Challenge Cup Final during the 1927–28 season at Central Park, Wigan, in front of a crowd of 33,909.

County Cup Final appearances
Billy Kirk played scored a try in Warrington's 15-2 victory over Salford in the 1929 Lancashire County Cup Final during the 1929–30 season at Central Park, Wigan on Saturday 23 November 1929.

References

External links
Statistics at wolvesplayers.thisiswarrington.co.uk

1909 births
1997 deaths
England national rugby league team players
English rugby league players
Liverpool City (rugby league) players
Place of birth missing
Place of death missing
Rugby league halfbacks
Rugby league players from Wigan
Warrington Wolves players